The 1970 Princeton Tigers football team was an American football team that represented Princeton University during the 1970 NCAA University Division football season. Princeton finished fifth in the Ivy League.

In their second year under head coach Jake McCandless, the Tigers compiled a 5–4 record and outscored opponents 196 to 180. Dennis J. Burns was the team captain.

Princeton's 3–4 conference record placed fifth in the Ivy League standings. The Tigers were outscored 175 to 130 by Ivy opponents.

Princeton played its home games at Palmer Stadium on the university campus in Princeton, New Jersey.

Schedule

References

Princeton
Princeton Tigers football seasons
Princeton Tigers football